Cannabis product testing is a form of product testing analyzes the quality of cannabis extracts, edibles, and THC and CBD levels in an emergent consumer market eager to sell adult use products. Analytical chemistry and microbiology laboratories are important entities in consumer protection. These labs not only determine the condition and viability of cannabinoids, water content, heavy metals, pesticides, terpenes, yeast, but also the presence of mold, mycotoxins, and solvents. These laboratories emerged when advocates of cannabis testing raised concerns about potential contaminants.

The popularity of cannabis and cannabinoid products continues to escalate following the legalization of cannabinoid products in the United States since 2012. Since 2012, ten states (Colorado, Oregon, Washington, Alaska, California, Nevada, Maine, Massachusetts, Vermont, and, in November 2018, by popular referendum, Michigan) and the District of Columbia have legalized recreational cannabis consumption and, except for the District of Columbia and Vermont, acted to implement legislation that also legalizes commercial production. By 2016, 23 states had legalized medical cannabis. Additionally, a number of states, as far back as the 1960s, have decriminalized the possession of small quantities of cannabis for personal use.By 2020, the majority of the U.S. population can purchase cannabis and cannabinoid products as easily as alcohol. But exposure to contaminants is often overlooked. Limited regulation threatens product safety in the "gold rush" era of a fast-growing cannabis industry. Analytical chemistry and microbiology testing that protects consumer safety and prevents unfair practices becomes an added cost that most startups avoid due to the lack of oversight of recreational and medicinal cannabis in the United States. Advanced analytical testing is critical given trade-offs between safety and quality in cannabinoid therapeutics and nutraceuticals. Product or compliance testing determines the chemical makeup and overall quality of the formulation before the sale of products.

History

Colorado
In 2015, the first government standards for testing were proposed in Colorado's legislature, when potency and microbial testing became mandatory in the state. Colorado cannabis testing laboratories, such as AgriScience Labs, are regulated by the Colorado Department of Revenue's Marijuana Enforcement Division and the Colorado Department of Public Health and Environment. Over the next several years, other tests became mandatory, such as residual solvent analysis and pesticides.

Other states
Cannabis testing is also required in other states, such as California, Oregon, Massachusetts, and Nevada. Washington State added routine pesticide testing and random or investigation-driven heavy metal testing, formerly required only for medical cannabis, to its testing suite for all cannabis on March 2, 2022.

Standards
Calls have been made to unify cannabis industry standards with existing testing organizations such as ASTM International (ASTM D37) or International Standards Organization (ISO/IEC 17025).

References

Sources

See also
Certificate of analysis

Cannabis
Product testing
Cannabis industry